Jim Driscoll is a retired American football coach and former player.  He is the former head football coach at the University of Mary in Bismarck, North Dakota, a position he had held from 1988 to 1990. 

Driscoll's stint as the head coach at the University of Mary came in between two stints as a defensive coach at Northern Michigan University in Marquette, Michigan.

References

External links
 Coaches Learning Network profile
 Northern Michigan Hall of Fame profile

Year of birth missing (living people)
Living people
American football offensive linemen
Mary Marauders football coaches
North Dakota Fighting Hawks football coaches
North Dakota State Bison football coaches
North Dakota State Bison football players
Northern Michigan Wildcats football coaches
High school football coaches in Michigan